Lucas Alberto Simón García (born 1 August 1986) is an Argentine naturalized Chilean professional footballer who currently plays for Trasandino in the Segunda División Profesional de Chile as a striker.

Club career

Early career
Born in Mar del Plata, Simón started his career at hometown club Cadetes de San Martín. In 2004, he was signed by Primera B Nacional club Nueva Chicago, with whom Simón won the 2006 Clausura Tournament, but lost the championship playoffs against Godoy Cruz. However, despite failing to win the final, he helped his team to earn promotion to the Argentine Primera División, after a 6–3 win against Belgrano, in which Simón scored twice.

Piacenza
In July 2006, he was signed by Italian Serie B club Piacenza. He scored 5 league goals in the first season, ranked 5th of the team, as the team third strikers, behind Daniele Cacia and Daniele Degano. In the next season, after Cacia was sold (himself remained in Piacenza due to injury), he became the only central forward in the starting XI, but soon the coach preferred Houssine Kharja as the emergency striker, Julien Rantier and Giuseppe Gemiti in supporting role. In mid-October (round 11), he returned to starting XI until Cacia recovered (round 15). In January 2008, Cacia returned to Fiorentina and Kharja was sold, but the club signed Zlatko Dedič (loan) and Alessandro Tulli, made Simón remained as the third striker.

In 2008–09 Serie B season, the club signed Davide Moscardelli as new central forward, and on 1 September 2008, he left the club along with 2 strikers after the club loaned striker Emanuele Ferraro from Salernitana. Which Simón was loaned to Pescara, and he scored 10 goals in Italian third highest division.

On 1 July 2009, Simón returned to Emilia. He had to compete with Tulli, Tomás Guzmán, Antonio Piccolo and Mattia Graffiedi for the remain place of supporting striker role in 4–3–3 formation, or as a backup central forward in 4–4–2 formation if Moscardelli was not available. The coach more frequently used Simone Guerra as supporting striker and Simón only made 8 start, 7 of them before the arrival of striker Edgar Çani in January.

In June 2010, he was loaned back to Argentina for Tigre.

Unión La Calera
On 10 July 2011, Simón joined to Chilean Primera División club Unión La Calera for play the Clausura Tournament of that season, after of put end to his contract with Piacenza. He netted a twice in his debut against Santiago Morning, scoring all goals of the game in a 2–0 home win. On 17 September, he scored another twice for the team of La Calera, during an incredible 3–0 win over Chilean powerhouse Colo-Colo at Santa Laura. On 2 October, against Palestino, he again scored a goal, after of fail to score after two weeks against Audax Italiano and Unión Española. Simón was a key player in the qualification of his team to the playoffs, scoring on 20 November, two of the three goals of his team against Ñublense, in a 3–1 away victory at Nelson Oyarzún Arenas.

Personal life
In January 2022, he acquired the Chilean nationality by residence, keeping the Argentine nationality.

References

External links
 La Gazzetta dello Sport (2006–07 season)  
 La Gazzetta dello Sport (2007–08 season)  
 
 
 

1986 births
Living people
People from Mar del Plata
Argentine footballers
Argentine expatriate footballers
Naturalized citizens of Chile
Chilean footballers
Association football forwards
Sportspeople from Mar del Plata
Cadetes de San Martín players
Nueva Chicago footballers
Piacenza Calcio 1919 players
Delfino Pescara 1936 players
Club Atlético Tigre footballers
Unión La Calera footballers
Club Deportivo Palestino footballers
C.D. Huachipato footballers
Deportivo Municipal footballers
Cobreloa footballers
Botafogo Futebol Clube (PB) players
Deportes Valdivia footballers
Deportes Recoleta footballers
Trasandino footballers
Primera Nacional players
Serie B players
Argentine Primera División players
Chilean Primera División players
Peruvian Primera División players
Primera B de Chile players
Segunda División Profesional de Chile players
Expatriate footballers in Italy
Argentine expatriate sportspeople in Italy
Expatriate footballers in Chile
Argentine expatriate sportspeople in Chile
Expatriate footballers in Peru
Argentine expatriate sportspeople in Peru
Expatriate footballers in Brazil
Argentine expatriate sportspeople in Brazil